Terumah is a Hebrew word, originally meaning lifted apart, but meaning donation in modern Hebrew. It can refer to:
Terumah (offering), a type of sacrifice in the Hebrew Bible
Terumat hamaaser, a tithing obligation arising from the Terumah sacrifice still regarded as obligatory by Orthodox Judaism on produce
Terumot, the plural of Terumah, and a section of the Mishnah concerning tithing obligations
Terumah (parsha), the nineteenth weekly portion of the Torah. It primarily contains the instructions on how to create the Tabernacle

Hebrew words and phrases